The Puente Colgado (Hanged Bridge) or Puente Colgante was a bridge on the Tagus river located in the town of Aranjuez, in the Community of Madrid, Spain.

This replaced the Puente de Barcas, an ancient bridge that never became the main access to Aranjuez.

It was built in the 1820s by Pedro Miranda. It had Classical style statues  It could be considered a door to the city of a dignity that did not demean to its surroundings, as well as an attractive element.

It was replaced due to the urgencies of the heavy traffic of an entire national highway running more practical solutions than beautiful.

Aranjuez
Neoclassical architecture in Spain
Bridges completed in the 1820s
Bridges in the Community of Madrid
Demolished bridges
Demolished buildings and structures in Spain
Buildings and structures demolished in the 20th century
20th-century disestablishments in Spain